Ondřej Novotný (born 5 February 1998) is a Czech football player. He plays in Czech National Football League for Sparta Prague.

Club career
He was raised in the Sparta Prague youth teams and first was called up to the senior squad on 24 November 2016 for the Europa League game against Southampton. He remained on the bench.

He represented Sparta in 2016–17 and 2017–18 seasons of UEFA Youth League.

On 19 February 2019 he joined Sellier & Bellot Vlašim on loan. He made his professional FNL debut for Vlašim on 3 March 2019 in a game against Dynamo České Budějovice. He finished the loan with 12 appearances, 7 as a starter.

For the 2019–20 season he joined Slovak club Ružomberok, on a loan. He scored his first Fortuna Liga goal for Ružomberok on 17 August 2019 in a 2–2 draw against Senica, utilising the pass of Alexander Mojžiš and securing single point for Ružomberok in the 65th minute.

References

External links
 

1998 births
Living people
Czech footballers
Czech expatriate footballers
Czech Republic youth international footballers
Association football forwards
AC Sparta Prague players
FC Sellier & Bellot Vlašim players
MFK Ružomberok players
FC Slovan Liberec players
Czech National Football League players
Slovak Super Liga players
Czech First League players
Expatriate footballers in Slovakia
Czech expatriate sportspeople in Slovakia
1. FK Příbram players